Eua or EUA may refer to:

Places 
 ʻEua, Tonga
 Eua (Cynuria), an ancient town of Cynuria, Greece
 Eva, Arcadia, Greece
 United States of America

Other uses 
 Emergency Use Authorization, a legal means for the U.S. Food and Drug Administration to approve new medical treatments during a declared emergency
 EU Allowance, climate credits used in the European Union Emissions Trading Scheme
 Eua (gastropod), a genus of snail
 ʻEua Airport, in Tonga
 Eua Sunthornsanan (1910–1981), Thai musician
 European Unit of Account, a predecessor of the euro
 European University Association
 United Team of Germany which competed in the 1956, 1960, and 1964 Olympic Games